HD 89890 is the brightest member of a multiple star system with at least four components, located in the southern constellation of Vela. It is visible to the naked eye with an apparent visual magnitude of 4.50. It is moving further away from Earth with a heliocentric radial velocity of +10 km/s.

System
The Washington Double Star Catalog lists three visible components for this system. The brightest, component A, is of visual magnitude 4.50. The physical link between the stars was described on the basis of their dynamic parallax and mean velocities.

Properties
Component A has a stellar classification of B3 III, and is categorized as a Be star. It shows photometric variations with multiple periods around 4.6 days and line-profile variations with a period of 2.318 days. The radial velocity of this star is constant.

The component B shows a variation in spectra consistent with being a double-lined spectroscopic binary. The brighter member (Ba) is a silicon star with a class of A0 IVpSi, while the fainter component (Bb) is of type A2. Component C has a class of K0 III, indicating it is an evolved giant star. The measured effective temperature of C is 5,500 K. The fact that component A most likely shares a common origin with C suggests that the former is much older than expected, and may actually be a blue straggler formed from the merger of a close binary. This could have been caused by the gravitational influence of an unseen companion of A.

References

B-type giants
Be stars
Blue stragglers
4
Vela (constellation)
Velorum, J
Durchmusterung objects
089890
4074
Velorum, MV
050676